A barndominium is a metal pole barn or barn-like structure with sheet metal siding that has been partially or fully converted into a furnished home or living area. Barndominium designs can include structural conversion into a full home, whereby the entire interior consists of a living area, and partial conversions, whereby part of the space is used for living and part is used for other purposes, such as a workshop, garage space, for storage or as an animal pen. Some barndominiums double as both a residence and as a place of business.

Due to their open-floor layout, barndominiums are highly customizable, and can be constructed as one-story or two-story dwellings. In the United States, some companies purvey barndominium kits that are customizable relative to local or state building requirements and geographical elements, such as risks of earthquakes, snow load levels and fire risks.

Barndominiums typically have lower overall construction, labor and materials costs compared to traditionally-built modern homes.

See also
 Barn
 Converted barn
 Housebarn
 List of house types

References

Further reading
 

House types
Barns